The Cancun Challenge is a college basketball tournament organized by Triple Crown Sports which currently features eight NCAA Division I men's basketball teams and ten women's basketball teams. The formats of the men's and women's tournaments have varied from year to year. The men's tournament currently splits the eight teams into two divisions of four and consists of games played in the United States at participants' campus sites followed by a bracketed tournament played in (or near) Cancún, Mexico. The women's tournament splits the ten teams into one division of six and one division of four and each features round-robin play in Cancún with no bracket, and therefore no champion. The two divisions in each tournament are the Riviera Division and the Mayan Division.

The Mexico portion of the event has been held at multiple venues in and around Cancún. The inaugural 2005 tournament was relocated from the Moon Palace Resort to the Aventura Spa Palace Resort in Playa del Carmen shortly before it was scheduled to occur due to damage sustained at the original location from Hurricane Wilma. The tournament was held at one of these two sites each year up until 2014, when it would be moved to the Hard Rock Hotel Riviera Maya, where it has been held since. CBS Sports Network televises the men's Riviera Division games. All Mexico games in the men's Mayan Division along with all women's games are streamed on FloHoops.

Previous men's champions include Vanderbilt (2008), Kentucky (2009), Missouri (2010), Illinois (2011), Wichita State (2012), Wisconsin (2013), Northern Iowa (2014), Maryland (2015), Purdue (2016), LA Tech (2017), Bradley (2018), West Virginia (2019), Clemson (2020), Saint Louis (2021) and Auburn (2022). Previous women's participating teams include marquee programs such as Arizona State, Baylor, Duke, Georgia Tech, Iowa, Iowa State, Kansas State, Maryland, Oklahoma, Purdue, Seton Hall, Stanford, UCLA, and Washington, among others.

Brackets 
* – Denotes overtime period

2022

Men's

Riviera Division

Mayan Division

2021

Men's

Riviera Division

Mayan Division

Women's 

All games streamed on FloHoops.com

Mayan Division

Riviera Division

2020 Space Coast Classic 
Due to COVID-19 pandemic the 2020 Cancún Challenge was not held, instead a 4 team tournament was branded as the Space Coast Challenge, games were played at Titan Field House in Melbourne, FL.

2019

Men's

Riviera Division

Mayan Division

Women's

Riviera Division

Mayan Division

2018

Men's

Riviera Division

Mayan Division

Women's

Riviera Division

Mayan Division

2017

Men's

Riviera Division

Mayan Division

Women's

Riviera Division

Mayan Division

2016

Men's

Riviera Division

Mayan Division

Women's

Riviera Division

Mayan Division

2015

Men's

Riviera Division

Mayan Division

Women's

Riviera Division

Mayan Division

2014

Men's

Riviera Division

Mayan Division

Women's

Riviera Division

Mayan Division

2013

Men's

Riviera Division

Mayan Division

Women's

Riviera Division

Mayan Division

2012

Men's

Riviera Division

Mayan Division

2011

Men's

Riviera Division

Mayan Division

2010

Men's

Riviera Division

Mayan Division

2009

Men's

Riviera Division

Mayan Division

2008

Men's

Riviera Division

References

External links
 Official website

College basketball competitions
Basketball competitions in Mexico
Sport in Cancún
2008 establishments in Mexico
Recurring sporting events established in 2008